Leszek Ryszard Dunecki (born 2 October 1956 in Toruń) was a Polish athlete who competed mainly in the 100 and 200 metres. He was the Polish champion on 6 occasions.

He won a European Championship Gold medal in 1978 in the 4x100 metres.

In 1979 was world student 100/200 runner up. Finishing 2nd only behind Pietro Mennea who ran the then new world record 19.72. Dunecki ran 20.26. Dunecki's Polish national record of 20.26 was improved in 1999, by Marcin Urbas (19.98 s), after 20 years.

He competed for Poland in the 1980 Summer Olympics held in Moscow, Soviet Union in the 100 where he reached the Quarter final, and the 200 metres where he reached the final and finished 6th. He also competed in the 4 x 100 metre relay where he won the silver medal with his teammates Krzysztof Zwoliński, Zenon Licznerski and Marian Woronin. In 1981 he was a member of the Polish/Europe 4x100 relay team that finished 1st in the world cup.

See also
Polish records in athletics

References

Sports Reference

Universiade

European Championships

1956 births
Living people
Sportspeople from Toruń
Polish male sprinters
Olympic silver medalists for Poland
Athletes (track and field) at the 1980 Summer Olympics
Olympic athletes of Poland
European Athletics Championships medalists
Medalists at the 1980 Summer Olympics
Olympic silver medalists in athletics (track and field)
Universiade medalists in athletics (track and field)
Universiade silver medalists for Poland
Medalists at the 1979 Summer Universiade